Tory Mussett is an Australian actress. Her first television appearance was in an episode of the detective drama Murder Call.  She later appeared in an episode of Flat Chat, and had a larger role in Crash Palace.

She had small parts both in The Matrix Reloaded (2003) as the Beautiful Woman at Le Vrai and in Peter Pan (2003) as one of the mermaids. This was followed by a more substantial role playing "Jessica" in the 2005 film Boogeyman. In 2006, she starred in the third episode of the TV miniseries Nightmares and Dreamscapes: From the Stories of Stephen King where she played the girlfriend of a private detective played by William H. Macy. In 2007 she starred as "Julie" in WWE Films Production of The Condemned starring Stone Cold Steve Austin. Tory was credited under the name "Victoria Mussett", appearing as a minor character in the Australian comedy show 30 Seconds in 2009, on The Comedy Channel. Tory played "Sally" in U.S. show Mistresses in 2013 on the ABC.

Private life 

She dated actor Toby Truslove for seven years.

References

External links

Australian film actresses
Australian television actresses
20th-century Australian actresses
21st-century Australian actresses
1978 births
Living people